MFC 26: Retribution was a mixed martial arts event held by the Maximum Fighting Championship (MFC) on September 10, 2010 at the River Cree Casino in Enoch, Alberta. The event was aired live on HDNet with commentators Michael Schiavello, Frank Trigg and Guy Mezger.

Background
This event featured an MFC Lightweight title fight between Antonio McKee and Luciano Azevedo. Prior to the fight, McKee declared that if Azevedo made it to a decision, then he would retire from mixed martial arts.

The event was originally scheduled to take place in Brandon, Manitoba, but was later moved to the regular venue of the River Cree Casino.

Results

References

See also
 Maximum Fighting Championship
 List of Maximum Fighting Championship events
 2010 in Maximum Fighting Championship

26
2010 in mixed martial arts
Mixed martial arts in Canada
Sport in Alberta
2010 in Canadian sports